is a Hiroden temporary station on the Hiroden Miyajima Line, located in Hatsukaichi, Hiroshima. It is used only during the speedboat race at Miyajima Speedboat Racing Stadium.

Routes
From the station, there is one Hiroden Streetcar route.
 Hiroshima Station - Hiroden-miyajima-guchi Route

Connections
█ Miyajima Line

Hiroden-ajina — Kyōteijō-mae (temporary stop) — Hiroden-miyajima-guchi

Around station
Miyajima Speedboat Racing Stadium

History
Opened as Kyōteijō-mae in 1954.
Renamed to Miyajima Boat Race Jō on April 1, 2019.

References

See also
Hiroden Streetcar Lines and Routes

Hiroden Miyajima Line stations
Railway stations in Japan opened in 1954